Rousky is a small village and townland in the Sperrins of County Tyrone, Northern Ireland. In the 2001 Census it had a population of 81. Rousky is on the main road between Gortin (to the west) and Greencastle (to the east). It lies within the parish of Badoney Lower, the barony of Strabane Upper and the Omagh District Council area.

References 

NI Neighbourhood Information System

Villages in County Tyrone